Indigenous Futurism is a movement consisting of art, literature, comics, games, and other forms of media which express Indigenous perspectives of the future, past, and present in the context of science fiction and related sub-genres. Such perspectives may reflect Indigenous ways of knowing, traditional stories, historical or contemporary politics, and cultural realities.

Background
In the anthology, Walking the Clouds: An Anthology of Indigenous Science Fiction, Dillon outlines how science-fiction can aid processes of decolonization. Using tools like slipstream, worldbuilding, science fiction and anthropological First Contact scenarios, Indigenous communities construct self-determined representations and alternative narratives about their identities and futures. Indigenous Futurists critique the exclusion of Indigenous people from the contemporary world and challenge notions of what constitutes advanced technology. In so doing, the movement questions the digital divide, noting that Indigenous peoples have at once been purposefully excluded from accessing media technologies and constructed as existing outside of modernity. The widespread use of personal computers and the Internet following the Digital Revolution created conditions in which, to some extent, Indigenous peoples may participate in the creation of a network of self-representations.

Grace Dillon, editor of Walking the Clouds: An Anthology of Indigenous Science Fiction, encouraged stories through IIF, the Imagining Indigenous Futurisms Science Fiction Contest. Lou Catherine Cornum is a writer, scholar, and Indigenous Futurist known for their work Space NDNs. Chickasaw scholar Jenny L. Davis emphasizes the importance of 'Indigenous language futurisms,' where she shows that Indigenous languages are important to articulating and understanding Indigenous temporalities.

Concepts

Time 
The concept of time in Indigenous Futurism moves away from Western traditional interpretations, both culturally and within the genre of speculative fiction. Time, according to Indigenous Futurists, encompasses and connects the past, present and future all at once. Artists may explore alternate histories, distant and near futures, separate timelines, time travel, the multiverse, and other topics in which time is not limited to a linear conceptualization. Historical themes of colonialism, imperialism, genocide, conflict, the environment, trade and treaties, which have impacted Indigenous cultures, are recurring and reexamined, creating new narratives in the process. Artists play with questions of race, privilege and "Whiteness", both in history and within the speculative genre; they are expanded upon, subverted, erased, reversed, etc., thereby linking culture to time, space, and what lies in-between. The term biskaabiiyang (Anishinaabe), used by Dillon, exemplifies how Indigenous creators reflect on the impact of colonization by returning to their ancestral roots, conflating past with present and future, as well as reframing what the world would or could be like.

In other words, Indigenous Futurisms do not solely address the future, but create a range of scenarios and phenomena in which reimaginations of space, time, and Indigeneity are celebrated.

Literature 
Literature lends itself to many aspects of Indigenous Futurism. Many of the stories revolving around Indigenous Futurisms contain an Indigenous main character, however, this does not define the genre, when referring to literature in Indigenous Futurisms we are referring to the Author, or the conceptualized stories, as defined in Dillon's anthology.

Literature is currently the most diverse subject in Indigenous Futurism, from stories such as Trail of Lightning by Rebecca Roanhorse, an urban-fantasy set in the near future consumed by monsters, to books such as Love After the End, compiled by Joshua Whitehead, which is a collection of stories and perspectives from queer Indigenous peoples tackling colonialism and the ideas of hope.

Art and film 
Art and film encompass the more visual aspect of Indigenous Futurism.

One large source of collective Indigenous Futurisms is on the CyberPowWow website, a site used for Native American artworks starting in 1997 to 2004. Many pieces of Indigenous Futurist artwork contain iconography or symbolism that reference Native American mythology or people. Another major facet of Indigenous Futurist artwork is the adaptation of existing culture and nomenclature. For instance, artist Bunky Echo-Hawk's “If Yoda was Indian” displays show a new perspective on Yoda from the franchise Star Wars.  

Kristina Baudemann focuses on storytelling and art and the integration of science fiction into indigenous art in Indigenous Futurisms in North American Indigenous Art. She says that indigenous people are resilient and sustainable and their art incorporates those characteristics. One specific indigenous artist, Ryan Singer, of the Navajo nation, uses many different mediums of art to create his pieces. He has two pieces of Princess Leia, from the Star Wars series that portrays the princess as Hopi and shares the idea of decolonization. In his first painting, Hopi Princess Leia (2009), he shows the Hopi Princess Leia holding a gun pointing straight at the audience while also staring directly at the audience as well. In his second Hope Princess Leia, named Hopi Princess Leia II (2010), Leia is seen holding a bigger gun and still looking directly at the audience. Baudemann analyses this depiction and says it creates awareness of the colonial gaze, which is harmful to indigeneity. In these paintings Princess Leia is seen clad in a Hopi blanket, wearing the hairstyle typical to unmarried Hopi girls. She is in front of her pueblo homes protecting them with her gun. Baudemann emphasizes the idea that Hopi homes should be seen as homes and not monuments that can be looked at by outsiders and they should not be appropriated. Princess Leia, in the Star Wars movies, loves her home and tries her hardest to protect it which is why Singer chose princess Leia to be depicted in these paintings.

Besides nominal artwork, Indigenous Futurisms are also displayed in film. A great example of Indigenous Futurisms is FutureStates’ "The 6th World", a short film that uses imagery, symbolism, and cultural practices of the Navajo people, in conjunction with the idea of colonizing Mars. Other interpretations in film include the 2021 television series Reservation Dogs, a show following Native American teenagers as they embark on a journey to California.

Indigenous Futurisms in film most commonly do not track or display Western wants and desires, and instead, reflect non-colonial encounters such as utopian sovereignty and dystopian assimilation. The continued development of Indigenous Futurist frameworks account for the diversity of creative efforts and histories between the Native American filmmakers and communities to influence the outside world.

Some Indigenous Futurist films include:

 Awakened (2016)
 Night Raiders (2021), directed by Danis Goulet

Video games 
While not as prominent as literature, art, film, video games provide a more hands on approach to the teaching and display of Indigenous Futurism.

Indigenous Futurist games range widely from games such as Thunderbird Strike, an action game where you take on the form of the legendary Thunderbird, gathering lightning to destroy mining equipment and factories on a terrorized and barren earth, to games such as Never Alone, which tells the story of a Iñupiat person and an arctic fox as they explore a dire atmosphere and experience the mythology of the Alaskan natives for themselves.

Virtual reality 
Virtual reality (VR) is a medium in which the concept of screen sovereignty can be used to combat misrepresentation of Indigenous people in media. Indigenous VR makers are shaping the culture of technology through VR in order to properly represent Indigenous people and their culture. Currently, white media creators dominate the digital media field and digital technology industries. Indigenous Matriarch 4 is a virtual reality company that provides Indigenous people with the tools they need to participate in and remake the virtual world. Because Indigenous people are often misrepresented in media, VR has become a place to creatively express Native American culture and ideas. Indigenous VR has also provided Indigenous people with the opportunity to be leaders in a new technology field, and to be involved in technology fields that previously excluded them and that had very little representation of Native American and Indigenous communities.

Virtual reality is being used to create space and capacity for Indigenous creatives to tell their stories. VR is used by many Indigenous practitioners to reimagine traditional storytelling and express themselves and their culture, promote health and wellbeing, and foster self-esteem and pride. New virtual platforms have also been created that retell significant moments in Indigenous history as well as connect to the present, like the platform AbTeC Island (Aboriginal Territories in Cyberspace).

The 2167VR Project (2017), in partnership with the Initiative for Indigenous Futures (TIIF),  commissioned the works of many Indigenous artists such as Danis Goulet, Kent Monkman, Postcommodity and Scott Benesiinaabandan, notable for his work Blueberry Pie Under a Martian Sky. This immersive project exhibits virtual reality works set 150 years forward in time, paralleling Canada's 150th anniversary, each offering a different perspective on the role Indigenous peoples and identities will have in building the future.

Exhibitions 
To increase this movement's visibility and bring attention to Indigenous voices, the Institute of American Indian Arts (IAIA) has established a branch, the Museum of Contemporary Native Arts (MoCNA), located in Santa Fe, New Mexico, which collects and exhibits over 10,000 Indigenous works. The MoCNA has an exhibition entitled Indigenous Futurisms, featuring the works of 27 contemporary Indigenous artists. Following the pandemic, the MoCNA has transferred the collection to an online gallery and made available a VR experience which the public can access through their devices.

Related movements 
The term Indigenous Futurism, more commonly written as Indigenous Futurisms, was coined by Grace Dillon, professor in the Indigenous Nations Studies Program at Portland State University. The term was inspired by Afrofuturism and Africanfuturism, all of which encapsulate multiple modes of art-making from literature to visual arts, fashion, and music.

Indigenous Futurisms are also connected to Chicanafuturism, "a spectrum of speculative aesthetics produced by U.S. Latin@s, including Chican@s, Puerto Ricans, Dominican Americans, Cuban Americans, and other Latin American immigrant populations. It also includes innovative cultural productions stemming from the hybrid and fluid borderlands spaces, including the U.S.-Mexico border."

Criticism 
Indigenous Futurisms as a term has received mixed feedback among Indigenous Brazilian musicians. Many Indigenous artists do not embrace this concept because they view preserving culture to be much more important than thinking about the future. For example, Indigenous rapper Kunumi MC, disagrees with the term, arguing that it is a white man's term unreflective of Indigenous people, saying: “We, native Indigenous people living in tribes, don’t think about the future,” he says. “The white man has a vision of progress, not us. Our progress is to preserve our culture ... to live in the present, I have to remember my past.”

List of Indigenous Futurists 
Artists working within the field of Indigenous Futurisms include Loretta Todd (Cree/Métis), a filmmaker who runs IM4, the Indigenous Matriarchs 4 XR Media Lab; Elizabeth LaPensée (Métis), a game designer and digital artist; Skawennati (Mohawk), a multimedia artist best known for her project TimeTraveller, a nine-episode machinima series that uses science fiction to examine First Nations histories;

 A Tribe Called Red, musicians 
 Barry Ace (Anishinaabe) multimedia artist based in Sudbury 
 KC Adams (Cree/Ojibway) multimedia artist based in Winnipeg
 Jason Baerg (Métis), multimedia artist
 Roy Boney, Jr. (Cherokee Nation), animator, illustrator, comic artist, painter 
 Grace Dillon (Anishinaabe) anthropological professor at Portland State University
 Bunky Echo-Hawk (Yakama and Pawnee) multimedia artist
 Rosalie Favell (Métis/Cree) digital artist based in Ottawa 
 Jason Garcia (Santa Clara Pueblo), ceramic artist, painter, printmaker
 Jeffrey Gibson, (Mississippi Choctaw/Cherokee), painter and sculptor  
 Danis Goulet (Métis/Cree) filmmaker and screenwriter based in Toronto  
 Stephen Graham Jones (Blackfeet), author
 Cheryl l'Hirondelle (non-status Métis descent), multimedia artist
 Elizabeth LaPensée (Anishinaabe/Métis descent), and Irish game designer
 Darcie Little Badger (Lipan Apache), author
 Jamie Okuma (Luiseño/Shoshone-Bannock) beadwork artist and fashion designer
 Virgil Ortiz (Cochiti) ceramic sculptor and designer
 Wendy Ponca (Osage), fashion designer, textile artist
 Wendy Red Star (Apsáalooke), installation artist, photographer
Rebecca Roanhorse (non-enrolled Ohkay Owingeh Pueblo) author
 Ryan Singer (Navajo), painter
 Skawennati (Mohawk), multimedia artist
 Will Wilson (Navajo), photographer

See also 
 CyberPowWow
 Indigenous people in video gaming
 Never Alone
 Thunderbird Strike

References

Further reading

External links 
 Virtual reality environment of "Indigenous Futurisms: Transcending Past/Present/Future, at the IAIA Museum of Contemporary Native Arts

Art movements
Futurism
Indigenous art
Indigenous mass media